Nicolas-Louis d'Assas (1733–1760), also known as Louis d'Assas du Mercou and Chevalier d'Assas, was a captain of the French Régiment d'Auvergne, whose celebrity depends on a single act of defiance.

He was born in Le Vigan, Languedoc, France.

Having entered a wood to reconnoitre it the night before the battle of Kloster Kampen in 1760, he was suddenly surrounded by enemy British soldiers. With bayonets at his breast, he cried out, "To me, Auvergne! Here is the enemy!" He was killed instantly, but in calling out defiantly he saved his countrymen.

Memory
The rue d'Assas in the 6th arrondissement of Paris was named after him.

References

1733 births
1760 deaths
People from Le Vigan, Gard
French Army soldiers
French military personnel killed in the Seven Years' War